Noble Cilley Powell (October 27, 1891 – November 28, 1968), was a prominent leader in the Episcopal Church in the United States of America, who served as the ninth Bishop of Maryland.

Early life and education
Powell was born on October 27, 1891 in Lowndesboro, Alabama, the son of Benjamin Shelley Powell and Mary Irving Whitman. He was educated at the Alabama Polytechnic Institute between 1911 and 1915 and then at the University of Virginia between 1915 and 1917. He then studied at the Virginia Theological Seminary and graduated in 1920 with a Bachelor of Divinity. He was awarded an honorary Doctor of Divinity in 1930 by Virginia Theological, another by Sewanee: The University of the South in 1942 and another from Washington College in 1957.

Ordained Ministry
Powell was ordained deacon in 1920, and priest on January 9, 1921 by Bishop William Cabell Brown of Virginia. From 1920 to 1931 he served as rector of St Paul's Memorial Church, in Charlottesville, Virginia, and also ministered during that period to students at the University of Virginia, who knew him as "Parson Powell." In 1931 he became rector of Emmanuel Church, Baltimore. He became Dean of Washington National Cathedral and warden of the College of Preachers in 1937.

Episcopacy
In 1941 he was elected Coadjutor Bishop of Maryland and was consecrated on October 17, 1941 by Presiding Bishop Henry St. George Tucker. He then succeeded Edward T. Helfenstein as diocesan in 1943, and was installed in the Cathedral of the Incarnation on November 21, 1943. He served as bishop of Maryland until 1963, when he was succeeded by Harry Lee Doll. Bishop Powell was married to Mary Wilkins Rustin in 1924. They had two sons, Philip and Thomas.

References

 David Hein, Noble Powell and the Episcopal Establishment in the Twentieth Century. Urbana: University of Illinois Press, 2001 (hardcover); Eugene, Ore.: Wipf & Stock, 2007 (paperback).

1891 births
1968 deaths
Auburn University alumni
University of Virginia alumni
Virginia Theological Seminary alumni
People from Lowndes County, Alabama
20th-century American Episcopalians
Episcopal bishops of Maryland
20th-century American clergy